Milan Dóczy (born January 27, 1990) is a Czech university ice hockey defenceman who currently plays for the Brock Badgers of Ontario University Athletics (OUA). He played with HC Oceláři Třinec in the Czech Extraliga during the 2010–11 Czech Extraliga season.

References

External links

1990 births
Brock Badgers ice hockey players
Czech ice hockey defencemen
HC Oceláři Třinec players
Living people
Owen Sound Attack players
Sportspeople from Zlín
Czech expatriate ice hockey players in Canada